Charles P. Leverich (1811-1880) was an American banker.

Biography

Early life
Charles Palmer Leverich was born in 1811. He had three brothers: Henry S. Leverich, James Harvey and Charles E. Leverich.

Career
From 1834 onwards, he became a factor for Stephen Duncan (1787-1867), the wealthiest cotton and sugar planter in the Antebellum South. He also served as a factor to the Minor and Connor families. Additionally, he was a factor to planters William Newton Mercer (1792-1874), Levin Marshall, William St. John Elliot, Francis Surget (1784-1856) and his son Francis Surget Jr. (1815-1866), Sam Davis, William T. Palfrey, Mary Porter and John Julius Pringle. He operated under the name of 'Charles P. Leverich & Co.', with a Southern office in New Orleans, Louisiana.

He joined the board of directors of the Bank of New York in 1840. He went on to serve as its Vice-president in 1853 and its President from 1863 to 1876. In this capacity, he helped raise US$50,000,000 for the Union army during the American Civil War of 1861-1865.

Personal life
Both he and his brother Henry married nieces of Stephen Duncan's.

Death
He died in 1880. His obituary was published in The New York Times.

References

1811 births
1880 deaths
Businesspeople from New York City
American bankers
19th-century American businesspeople